Colleen Young is a Canadian provincial politician, who currently serves as the Member of the Legislative Assembly of Saskatchewan for the district of Lloydminster. She was first elected in a by-election on November 14, 2014. She is a member of the Saskatchewan Party caucus. She was re-elected in the 2016 general election.

Prior to her election to the legislature, Young was chair of the Lloydminster Public School Board, and served on the senate of the University of Saskatchewan.

Electoral history

2016 Saskatchewan general election

2014 Lloydminster provincial by-election

References

Living people
People from Lloydminster
Saskatchewan Party MLAs
Women MLAs in Saskatchewan
21st-century Canadian politicians
21st-century Canadian women politicians
Saskatchewan school board members
Year of birth missing (living people)